Elías Enoc Vásquez Prera (born 18 June 1992) is a Guatemalan football defender who plays for Primera División club Marquense.

Club career

CSD Comunicaciones (2011-2014)
Vásquez began his professional career at Comunicaciones. He scored his first league goal in July 2012 against Marquense.

Dorados de Sinaloa (2014-2015)
He was signed by Dorados in June 2014.

Real Salt Lake (2015)
Vásquez signed with Major League Soccer club Real Salt Lake on 24 February 2015. He was released following the 2015 season.

International career
In 2011, he was the captain of the Guatemala U-20 squad that competed at the 2011 FIFA U-20 World Cup, and was then called up to the senior national team, making his full international debut against Jamaica at the 2011 CONCACAF Gold Cup.

Honours
Comunicaciones 
Liga Nacional de Guatemala: Apertura 2011, Clausura 2013, Apertura 2013, Clausura 2014, Apertura 2014

Career statistics

References

External links

1992 births
Living people
Guatemalan footballers
Guatemalan expatriate footballers
Guatemala international footballers
Association football defenders
2011 CONCACAF Gold Cup players
2013 Copa Centroamericana players
2014 Copa Centroamericana players
2015 CONCACAF Gold Cup players
Comunicaciones F.C. players
Dorados de Sinaloa footballers
Real Salt Lake players
Deportivo Anzoátegui players
Deportivo Sanarate F.C. players
Cobán Imperial players
Major League Soccer players
Venezuelan Primera División players
Sportspeople from Guatemala City
Guatemalan expatriate sportspeople in Mexico
Guatemalan expatriate sportspeople in the United States
Expatriate footballers in Mexico
Expatriate soccer players in the United States
Expatriate footballers in Venezuela